List of members of the 1st Jatiya Sangsad This is a list of Members of Parliament (MPs) elected to the 1st Parliament of the Jatiya Sangsad, the National Parliament of Bangladesh, by Bangladeshi constituencies. The list includes both MPs elected at the 1973 general election, held on 7 March 1973, and nominated women's members for reserved seats and those subsequently elected in by-elections.

Members

Elected members of parliament

Members of the Reserved Women's Seat

References 

Members of the Jatiya Sangsad by term
1st Jatiya Sangsad members
Lists of legislators by term